is a Japanese female announcer and news anchor for NHK. Wakuda previously is one of the anchors hosting NHK General TV's primetime news program News Watch 9.

Early years
Wakuda was born in Kanagawa Prefecture, Japan. At age two, she moved with her family to Houston, Texas. She returned to Japan when she was five years old, and was raised in Kawasaki and Yokohama. Wakuda attended Joshigakuin Junior & Senior High School in Tokyo, graduating in 2007, where she belonged to a performing arts club and played straight plays and musicals in English language. She then went to University of Tokyo, one of Japan's most prestigious universities, from which she received the BEc degree in March 2011. As an undergraduate, she was a manager and trainer of the university's men's lacrosse club.

Career
After graduating from University of Tokyo in 2011, Wakuda was hired by NHK. Several months later she was sent to NHK Okayama Branch where she started her career as a broadcaster.

In April 2014, Wakuda was relocated to Tokyo Announcement Room and appointed to a weekend & holiday newscaster of the morning news show NHK News Ohayō Nippon. One year later she became a weekday anchor of the show, starring every weekday from 6:00 am to 8:00 am JST.

On January 17, 2015, Wakuda was reporting from Kobe, Japan, which the Great Hanshin-Awaji Earthquake hit on that day 20 years before.

In May 2017, Wakuda conducted an interview with Masayoshi Yoshino, the minister responsible for disaster reconstruction in the Tohoku Region. In August 2017, she also interviewed with each minister newly chosen by Japanese Prime Minister Shinzo Abe in those days. Each interview was broadcast on NHK News Ohayō Nippon in the end of the month.

In the beginning of September 2018, Wakuda, together with Yurie Omi, conducted an exclusive interview with Namie Amuro, one of Japan's leading pop singers who was planning to end her musical career on September 16, 2018. This interview aired in NHK News Ohayō Nippon on September 10, 2018.

NHK announced on February 13, 2020, that Wakuda would be stepping back from NHK News Ohayō Nippon and move to News Watch 9 in April 2020. The anchor of NHK News Ohayō Nippon was handed over to Maho Kuwako, who was at that time one of the anchors of News Watch 9.

NHK announced on February 10, 2022, that Wakuda would be stepping down from News Watch 9 and she will be in charge of special features and narration in April 2022. The anchor of News Watch 9 was handed over to Izumi Yamauchi, who was at that time one of the anchors of NHK News Ohayō Nippon.

NHK announced on February 8, 2023 that Wakuda was appointed as news anchor of NHK News 7.

Personal life
It was reported that Wakuda had got married early in 2019 with a man whose name was not disclosed.

See also
 Kozo Takase
 Wataru Abe
 Maho Kuwako
 Yurie Omi
 Minori Chiba
 Nonoka Akaki

References

External links
  Mayuko Wakuda, NHK Announcement Room

|-

1988 births
Living people
University of Tokyo alumni
Japanese announcers
Japanese television personalities
Japanese television presenters
Japanese women television presenters
People from Kanagawa Prefecture